Piedino il questurino (Italian for "Littlefoot the policeman") is a 1974 criminal comedy film directed by Franco Lo Cascio and starring Franco Franchi. It is a parody of Steno's Flatfoot.

Plot

Cast 
 
 Franco Franchi as Franco Petralia 
  Irina Maleeva as  Maria 
 Rosita Pisano as Nunziatina 
 Giuseppe Anatrelli as Pascalone Pera
 Giacomo Rizzo as Nunziatina's Son
 Nino Terzo as Pascalone's Brother 
 Enzo Andronico as  Commissioner Pappacoda
 Luca Sportelli as Scrap Yard Owner
  Pinuccio Ardia as  Ferdinando Quagliarone aka 'Baron'  
 Renato Malavasi as  Polpetti
 Dante Cleri as  Waiter 
  Gino Pagnani as Spacciatore  
  Gastone Pescucci as Priest

References

External links

Italian crime comedy films
1970s crime comedy films
1974 comedy films
1974 films
1970s Italian films